Ayansuthamalli is a village in the Ariyalur taluk of Ariyalur district, Tamil Nadu, India.

Demographics 

 census, Avansuthamalli had a total population of 1610 with 836 males and 774 females.

References 

Villages in Ariyalur district